These are the official results of the 2008 Asian Indoor Athletics Championships, which took place on 14–16 February 2008 in Doha, Qatar.

Men's results

60 meters

Heats – 14 February

Final – 14 February

400 meters

Heats – 14 February

Final – 15 February

800 meters

Heats – 14 February

Semi-finals – 15 February

Final – 16 February

1500 meters
15 February

3000 meters
16 February

60 meters hurdles

Heats – 15 February

Final – 15 February

4 x 400 meters relay
16 February

High jump
14 February

Pole vault
15 February

Long jump
16 February

Triple jump
15 February

Shot put
16 February

Heptathlon
15–16 February

Women's results

60 meters

Heats – 14 February

Final – 14 February

400 meters

Heats – 14 February

Final – 15 February

800 meters
16 February

1500 meters
14 February

3000 meters
15 February

60 meters hurdles
15 February

4 x 400 meters relay
16 February

High jump
16 February

Pole vault
14 February

Long jump
14 February

Triple jump
14 February

Shot put
14 February

Pentathlon
14 February

References
Results – Day 1
Results – Day 2 (archived)
Results – Day 3 (archived)

Asian Indoor Championships
Events at the Asian Indoor Athletics Championships